Tao Zhu (16 January 1908 – 30 November 1969) was a member of the Politburo Standing Committee of the Chinese Communist Party .

Biography
Born in Qiyang, Hunan, Tao Zhu was Secretary of the Guangdong Provincial Committee and Commander of the Guangzhou Military Region. In 1958, during the initial stages of the Great Leap Forward, he participated enthusiastically in the "anti-hoarding campaign" in Guangdong, believing that reported production figures were real, and that the observed food shortage was only due to peasants' hoarding. Within a year, he realized his mistake as his campaign was not able to discover stored food supplies in villages; in fact, most peasants were starving. In the 1959 Lushan Conference, he initially sympathized with Peng Dehuai in his criticism of the Great Leap Forward. However, after a harsh reaction from Mao Zedong, Tao Zhu switched sides and joined up in Mao's attack on "right-leaning opportunists", submitting a list of his own officials that he identified as "opportunists". Nonetheless, in Guangdong, Tao's government took steps to reverse the damage of the Great Leap Forward by expanding individual peasant ownership of land and allowing emigration to Hong Kong.

He later became First Secretary of the Central-South region, and in 1965 was moved to Beijing to replace Lu Dingyi as Director of the Central Propaganda Department when Lu was purged for not adhering strongly to the Maoist line. Tao was a Vice Premier of the State Council and Secretary of the Central Secretariat of the CPC, as well as an advisor to the Cultural Revolution Group.

In May 1966, Tao Zhu was promoted to No. 4 in the party, behind Mao Zedong, Lin Biao and Zhou Enlai. That allowed his protégé, Zhao Ziyang, to take over as head of Guangdong province. Tao and Zhao were among the most enthusiastic of the early pro-Red Guard CPC leaders, but quickly fell from favour because they tried to control the excesses of the radical leftists led by Zhang Chunqiao and Jiang Qing.  Tao became a member of the Politburo Standing Committee at the Eleventh Plenum in August 1966 at the outset of the Cultural Revolution, but was attacked soon after, and labelled "the proxy leader of Liu-and-Deng-roaders" and a "Khrushchev-style ambitionist" by leading radical leftists. He was placed under house arrest in early 1967.

While under house arrest, Tao was diagnosed with gallbladder cancer, but was initially denied medical treatment. Zhou Enlai eventually intervened to arrange an operation, but by then Tao's cancer was too advanced to treat successfully, and Tao died in a hospital. Tao's family was not allowed to see him either on his deathbed or after his death. He was posthumously exonerated in 1978, after Deng Xiaoping rose to power. He was remembered as a man of great integrity.

Tao's daughter, Tao Siliang, became a Chinese politician in the late 1980s, leading several government initiatives in public health and the import of Western medical technology.

References

|-

|-

|-

|-

1908 births
1969 deaths
Governors of Guangdong
Chinese Communist Party politicians from Hunan
Victims of the Cultural Revolution
People's Republic of China politicians from Hunan
Politicians from Yongzhou
Academic staff of Jinan University
Presidents of Jinan University
Educators from Hunan
Deaths from cancer in the People's Republic of China
Deaths from gallbladder cancer
Heads of the Publicity Department of the Chinese Communist Party
Members of the 8th Politburo Standing Committee of the Chinese Communist Party
Members of the Secretariat of the Chinese Communist Party
People from Qiyang County
Burials at Babaoshan Revolutionary Cemetery